Kim McMillan (née Ambrester, born  1963) is an American Democratic politician who was mayor of Clarksville, Tennessee from 2011 until Joe Pitts was sworn in on January 2, 2019. McMillan was also the first woman in Tennessee history to be elected Majority Leader of the Tennessee House of Representatives. She was a candidate in the 2010 Tennessee gubernatorial election, but dropped out to run for mayor of Clarksville.

Education 
McMillan graduated from Knoxville’s South-Young High School and from the University of Tennessee at Knoxville. She received her J.D. degree from the University of Tennessee College of Law.

Political career 
In 2006, McMillan did not seek re-election to the Tennessee House of Representatives and accepted an appointment by Tennessee Governor Phil Bredesen to his Cabinet, where she served as Senior Advisor to the Governor. In 2008, she returned to her hometown of Clarksville, Tennessee.

McMillan entered the 2010 Tennessee gubernatorial election on March 1, 2009. On March 31, 2010 she dropped out of the race for governor, announcing that she would instead run for mayor of Clarksville. and support Mike McWherter's candidacy for governor.

Family 
McMillan was formerly married to Larry McMillan, who is Chancellor for the 19th Judicial District of Tennessee.

See also
2010 Tennessee gubernatorial election

References

External links 
Kim McMillan for Tennessee official campaign website

1960s births
Living people
Women mayors of places in Tennessee
Mayors of places in Tennessee
Members of the Tennessee House of Representatives
State cabinet secretaries of Tennessee
University of Tennessee alumni
University of Tennessee College of Law alumni
Women state legislators in Tennessee
21st-century American politicians
21st-century American women politicians
People from Clarksville, Tennessee